Unconditionally Guaranteed is the eighth LP by Captain Beefheart and the Magic Band, originally released in 1974. It was recorded at Hollywood Sound, Los Angeles.

Upon release it was criticised for being too commercial; even so, it failed to give Beefheart any real chart success, peaking at #192 on the Billboard Top 200.

Aftermath
Immediately after recording of the album the entire Magic Band quit – as biographer Mike Barnes has stated, "[Beefheart] was in effect sacked by his own group." They had become increasingly disenchanted with the lack of financial success, having subsisted on food stamps and donations from their parents, and with Beefheart's tyrannical control over the group. In the words of guitarist Bill Harkleroad "we had had enough of him treating us like punching bags."

The album's lackluster and unchallenging music was the last straw. Drummer Art Tripp recalled, "When the band finally got our album copies, we were horrified. As we listened, it was as though each song was worse than the one which preceded it."

After his contract with Mercury Records ended at the end of 1974, Beefheart disowned the record along with its successor Bluejeans & Moonbeams. He urged his fans to "take copies back for a refund" and called the albums "horrible and vulgar".

Track listing

Personnel
 Captain Beefheart (Don Van Vliet) – vocals, harmonica
 Alex St. Clair – guitar
 Zoot Horn Rollo (Bill Harkleroad) – guitar, glass finger guitar
 Rockette Morton (Mark Boston) – bass
 Art Tripp – drums, percussion

Additional personnel
 Mark Marcellino – keyboards
 Andy DiMartino – acoustic guitar
 Del Simmons – tenor saxophone, flute

References 

Captain Beefheart albums
1974 albums